Angola competed at the 2004 Summer Paralympics in Athens, Greece. The country was represented by four athletes (three men, one woman) who all competed in athletics.

Medalists

Sports

Athletics

Men's track

Women's track

See also
Angola at the Paralympics
Angola at the 2004 Summer Olympics

References

External links
International Paralympic Committee

Nations at the 2004 Summer Paralympics
2004
Summer Paralympics